The 2018 Waterford Senior Hurling Championship was the 118th staging of the Waterford Senior Hurling Championship since its establishment by the Waterford County Board.

Ballygunner were the defending champions.

On 7 October 2018, Ballygunner won the championship after a 2-19 t 0-13 defeat of Abbeyside in the final. It was their 17th championship title overall and their fifth title in succession.

Ballygunner's Pauric Mahony was the championship's top scorer with 2-66.

Results

Group A

Table

Group A results

Group B

Table

Group B results

Group C

Table

Group C results

Knock-out stage

Quarter-final play-offs

Relegation play-offs

Quarter-finals

Semi-finals

Final

Championship statistics

Top scorers

Top scorers overall

Top scorers in a single game

Miscellaneous

 Ballygunner's score of 7-30 against Ballyduff Upper is believed to be the biggest score recorded in a championship match since a Mount Sion-Erin's Own clash in 1948.

References

Waterford Senior Hurling Championship
Waterford